is a village located in Nakagami District, Okinawa Prefecture, Japan.

, the village has an estimated population of 16,040 and the density of 1,400 persons per km². The total area is 11.53 km². It is home to Nakagusuku Castle and the Nakagusuku Hotel ruins.

The village has quite a few centenarians.

Education
The village has the following municipal schools:
 Kitanakagusuku Junior High School (北中城中学校)
 Kitanagagusuku Elementary School (北中城小学校)
 Shimabuku Elementary School (島袋小学校)

References

External links

 Kitanakagusuku official website 

Villages in Okinawa Prefecture